Víctor Manuel Coreas Privado (born 30 March 1963 in Quelepa) is a former Salvadoran professional football player and currently manager.

He is the brother of former international player Salvador Coreas Privado.

Club career
Coreas has spent his playing career at Vendaval, Águila and Municipal Limeño.

International career
Coreas has represented El Salvador in 1 FIFA World Cup qualification match, against the United States in November 1989.

Managerial career

Municipal Limeño
After retiring as a player at Municipal Limeño, Coreas was assistant coach at the club.

Vista Hermosa
He then worked at Vista Hermosa between 2007 and 2009, before being sacked and returned to Municipal Limeño in August 2009 to replace Miguel Aguilar Obando.

Return to Vista Hermosa
In December 2010, he was again appointed coach of Vista Hermosa.

Águila
At the start of 2012, he was appointed head coach of Águila and in his first tournament as coach of the team of San Miguel he took them to their first title since 2006 (and their 15th title in their history).

Pasaquina
In June 2015, Coreas signed as new coach of Pasaquina, replacing Juan Andrés Sarulyte. In December 2015, Coreas left the club and was replaced by Hugo Ovelar.

Dragón
In March 2017, Coreas signed as new coach of Dragón for the rest of the Clausura 2017, replacing Nelson Mauricio Ancheta. In October 2018, Coreas was replaced by Omar Sevilla.

However, after only coaching two games, Coreas resigned and was replaced by Henry Vanegas.

Return to El Roble
In 2017, Coreas signed again as new coach of El Roble.

Return to Municipal Limeño
In March 2018, Coreas signed as new coach of Municipal Limeño, replacing Wilfredo Molina.

Achievements

Managerial stats

References

1963 births
Living people
People from San Miguel Department (El Salvador)
Association football defenders
Salvadoran footballers
El Salvador international footballers
C.D. Águila footballers
Salvadoran football managers
Municipal Limeño managers
C.D. Águila managers